Thecesternus is a genus of broad-nosed weevils in the beetle family Curculionidae. There are about seven described species in Thecesternus.

Species
These seven species belong to the genus Thecesternus:
 Thecesternus affinis (LeConte, 1857) i c g
 Thecesternus albidus Pierce, 1909 i c g
 Thecesternus foveolatus Pierce, 1909 i c g
 Thecesternus hirsutus Pierce, 1909 i c g
 Thecesternus humeralis (Say, 1826) i c g b
 Thecesternus longior (LeConte, 1857) i c g
 Thecesternus maculosus Pierce, 1909 i c g b
Data sources: i = ITIS, c = Catalogue of Life, g = GBIF, b = Bugguide.net

References

Further reading

 
 
 
 

Entiminae
Articles created by Qbugbot